The electrification of railways in Poland was a process aimed at increasing the efficiency of railways by implementing electric rolling stock and replacing steam traction locomotives, and improving the services offered. By the end of the 1970s, thanks to massive electrification and the introduction of a large amount of electric rolling stock into service, it allowed to replace a large number of steam locomotives and older diesel rolling stock. Despite the abandonment of works in the 90s, currently PKP and other entities managing the railway infrastructure, such as PKM or DSDiK, are working on the implementation or are already implementing the electrification of their lines. Currently, the electrification of railways in Poland is aimed at improving rail transport by increasing competitiveness and attractiveness and replacing diesel traction of national importance and saving fuel on regional lines and railways mains such as line 31 from Siedlce to Siemianówka, line 137 from Kędzierzyn-Koźle to Legnica and line 203 from Tczew to Kostrzyn.

The electric railways in Poland are powered by 3 kV DC and the length of electrified lines is over 12,165 km. The share of electric rolling stock in Poland is over 84.3%.

Early electrifications under German rule 
The first plans for the electrification of railways in Poland appeared before the outbreak of World War I, but works on the electrification of railways in the contemporary Polish lands was started by the Germans starting on August 15, 1897, the construction of an electrified railway line in the city of Wąbrzeźno. The railway line was put into use on April 1, 1898 and it was the first electric railway in Poland, and the line itself was of a suburban nature. In 1914 at Lower Silesia electrifying and opening the railway line from Szczawienka to the Czech Meziměstí on 15 kV AC system. In the same year, the Jugowice - Walim railway line was also opened. In the following years, the number of electrified railway lines in Lower Silesia grew, thanks to which it was possible to run electric trains from Wrocław via Wałbrzych, Jelenia Góra to Węgliniec as well as Zgorzelec and Leśna. Until the 1939, over 391.87 km of railway lines were electrified in Lower Silesia. Further works were suspended due to the outbreak of World War II.

Second Polish Republic 

At the request of the Government Commission, professor R. Podoski developed a project for the electrification of railways in Poland, which included the electrification of the Warsaw Junction
Kolejowy and the electrification of the Warsaw – Kraków – Katowice, Warsaw – Przemyśl – Lviv lines. In 1921, according to the request of prof. Roman Podoski, a bold decision was made at that time that the electrification would be a modern DC system with a voltage of 3000 V, not widely used at that time. so a small number of them) and allowed for the collection of energy in the form of 3-phase current from existing power plants. In 1926, for financial reasons, there was a standstill in works, in 1928 a detailed schedule of works was adopted for the years 1928 to 1931, providing for the commissioning of the electrified cross-city line in November 1931.

In the years 1925–1927, thanks to the support of English capital, a line managed by the carrier from Warsaw to Grodzisk Mazowiecki was built on the basis of a concession for a section from Warsaw to Żyrardów, issued to industrialists from Łódź, who - interested in the project - relinquished it to EKD. The EKD was made available to passengers on December 11, 1927.

At the beginning of 1931, the Ministry of Communications turned to larger foreign enterprises dealing with electric traction for offers for the electrification of the Warsaw cross-city line with a variant of electrification of suburban traffic on three lines, on credit terms. At the request of the Ministry, 17 offers were received, the comparison of which confirmed the advisability of electrification of the rail with 3 kV direct current, but the proposed credit terms were unacceptable. It is interesting that there was no offer from England among them, even though, as it turns out, the electrification was carried out by English companies.

On August 2, 1933, PKP concluded an agreement with two English companies: The English Electric Company and Metropolitan Vickers Electrical Company, with experience in the construction of 3 kV devices, for the implementation of the first stage of electrification of WKW within 4 years on credit terms.

The Warszawa Wschodnia – Otwock section was ready on August 14, 1936, and on December 15 of that year, the trains on the section from Otwock to Pruszków were officially launched.

In 1937, electric trains were launched on the section Pruszków – Grodzisk Mazowiecki. On September 6, on the section Grodzisk Mazowiecki – Żyrardów, on December 15, on the last section scheduled for electrification in the first stage, that is, from Warszawa Wschodnia to Mińsk Mazowiecki.

For the maintenance and repair of electric rolling stock, initially consisting of 6, and later 10 4-axle electric locomotives of the English EL 100 and Polish EL 200 series and 76 wagon unbalanced electric multiple units, popularly known as 91000 and 92000 series units, and a few years after the war as EW51 and EW52 for those refurbished in East Germany, was built in West Warsaw at Armatnia Street, the Main Electrotraction Workshop with an adjacent power plant in Grochów.

Further electrification plans were interrupted by the outbreak of World War II.

Communist era

Post-war condition
After the end of hostilities, the railway infrastructure was in a very bad condition. Due to the terrible condition of the economy, especially the electrotechnical industry, it was impossible to undertake the production of rolling stock in the country. Already at the end of the 1940s, the planning of further electrification of the lines, including the Coal Main from Chorzów to Tczew, began, but at that time electrification was not possible. However, the reconstruction of the pre-war traction network at the Warsaw railway junction was undertaken. In addition, shortly after the end of the war, the German traction network in Lower Silesia, except for the Jugowice-Walim railway line, was completely liquidated, on which the traction network remained at 1000 V DC for some time.
 
Already in 1945, equipment for the Brwinów substation and two mobile substations assembled on railway vehicles were ordered from the Swedish concern ASEA. At the beginning of 1946, preliminary talks were started with the ASEA concern regarding the conclusion of a loan agreement for large deliveries of electrotraction equipment for the Warsaw node. The Swedish delivery was to include 44 three-car electric multiple units, 8 BoBo electric locomotives, complete equipment of 6 traction substations and section cabins, and equipment for remote control electric system control room. The contract was signed on April 16, 1947.

The electric policy is not yet the preparatory period, but steam traction was almost electric. There was resistance or what is complemented by the entries for the correction of this transaction on the entry transaction record. The effectiveness of the Railway Electrification Office has developed in practice:

Efficiency Reconstruction of the pre-war state and further electrification electrification of suburban traffic in WWK
Electrification of urban and suburban traffic on the Gdańsk Coast, i.e. in the Tri-City Gdańsk - Sopot - Gdynia
Electrification of the Warsaw - Częstochowa - Katowice - Gliwice line with a branch to Łódź and Kraków

Complementary ASEA mobile substations, periodically constructed for the construction of 1948. The queue first passed to replace substations and missions, which prevent the operation of traffic to Warsaw East - Mińsk Mazowiecki. The trains started from Warszawa Wschodnia station to Miłosny 3 February, and to Mińsk Mazowiecki on March 14, 1948.
At the turn of 1947 and 1948, technical possibilities of technical problems related to technical problems on the market, problems related to PKP with breakthrough capital due to the traditions of the interwar period. 
Due to the future electrification of the GWK using the standard voltage of 3 kV direct current for PKP, it was decided to build a traction network with dimensions and insulation typical for a voltage of 3 kV. Direct current with a voltage of 800 V was to be provided by traction substations, for which equipment was ordered in England at the turn of 1947 and 1948.

In the years 1948–1951, the electrification of the lines on the Coast from Gdańsk to Sopot was carried out, on which the traction network was put into service in 1951–1952. The rolling stock operated on the line were electric multiple units of the EW90, EW91 and EW92 series, imported from the Berlin S-Bahn as part of war reparations. In the following years, from 1953 to 1957, further fragments of the Tricity line from Sopot through Gdynia to Wejherowo were electrified.

1952–1963
From 1952, the pace of electrification of railway lines in Poland gained momentum. On March 14, 1952, the railway line from Warszawa Wileńska to Zielonka was electrified. On the same day, the traction network from Zielonka to Tłuszcz was put into use. At the turn of 1957–1958, the electrification of the line from Otwock to Pilawa was completed.

On September 10, 1954, the first electric train from Warsaw arrived in Łódź, entering the Łódź Fabryczna station.

In 1955, the Piotrków Trybunalski – Częstochowa section was electrified, but the first electric train arrived in Częstochowa on January 21, 1956. A few months later, on May 1, electric trains began to reach Zawiercie. On June 3, the traction network for Łazy was put into operation. Then, until 1957, the railway line from Łazy to Gliwice was electrified. After the Warsaw – Gliwice main line was fully commissioned in 1957, the speed of electric trains - compared to steam trains - increased for passenger trains from 40.8 to 65.3 km / h, and for freight trains - from 29 to 49 km / h. Compared to the operation with steam traction, 60% carbon savings and significant savings in wagons were achieved. Rail transport between Silesia and Warsaw has been improved for a long time.

The obtained investment and operational experience related to the first main line and the WWK electrification allowed the Ministry of Communications to develop general assumptions for the electrification of railways in Poland, which were used, among others, by to make a significant decision by the minister to abandon the purchase of steam locomotives for PKP from 1957. It is worth adding that during its construction, a practically large team of specialists was educated for the electrification of subsequent railway routes. In the area of the Łódź junction, the Bedoń - Łódź Olechów - Łódź Kaliska and Łódź Widzew - Łodź Chojny connections with a total length of 26 km were electrified (January 25, 1958). In this way, it was possible to connect three most important stations of the Łódź agglomeration by electric traction. (Widzew, Chojny, Łódź Kaliska)
In the years 1961–1962, the electrification of the very important Warsaw-Poznań bus began. On March 22, 1961, 71 km electrified section Sochaczew - Łowicz - Kutno was put into operation. On the 29 September 1962 section Kutno - Konin 79 km, electrification thus reached the area of DOKP Poznań.

Ongoing plans for the electrification of the PKP network include the main lines connecting Upper Silesia with the developing Kraków district and connecting Upper Silesia with Lower Silesia, i.e. with the Wrocław district. The following set of lines were among those electrified and commissioned:

 Katowice – Szczakowa 22 km, May 14, 1959
 Ząbkowice – Szczakowa 16 km, April 30, 1959
 Szczakowa – Mydlinki – Kraków Płaszów 59 km, September 29, 1959

The necessity to improve and increase the railway transport capacity on the Upper Silesia - Wrocław communication route formed the basis of government decisions regarding the modernization and electrification of the Gliwice - Pyskowice – Opole – Wrocław railway line. The electrification of this trunk was carried out in stages, the entire trunk line was commissioned by electric traction on the following dates:

 Gliwice – Pyskowice – Strzelce Opolskie (along with the second pair of tracks on the section Gliwice – Łabędy) – Opole Główna – Święta Katarzyna – Wrocław Brochów 158 km on 3 October 1960.
 Święta Katarzyna – Wrocław Główny 10 km on December 15, 1960,

In 1961, additional connections in the Opole area were electrified: Groszowice - Opole Główna Towarowe (3 km) and Groszowice - Opole Wschodnie (6 km). In 1962, the section Brochów - Wrocław Towarowy (3 km) was additionally electrified in the area of Wrocław. The electrification investment Gliwice - Wrocław also includes the electrification of branches along the Odra River: Gliwice - Łabędy - Kędzierzyn - Groszowice (83 km).

In the Katowice junction itself, in 1961, the suburban section Katowice - Katowice Ligota - Tychy - Tychy Miasto was electrified. In 1962, the following sections were put into operation by electric traction:

 Podłęże – Bogumiłowice, 51 km, April 28, 1962.
 Bogumiłowice – Tarnów Zachodni 4 km

In 1959, the traction network on the Jugowice Walim railway line was liquidated along with passenger traffic, which was served by steam locomotives for a few more months, and was finally liquidated by 1960. Freight traffic on this line was served until 1975, and the line itself was dismantled in 1984.

The EP02 series electric locomotives (1953–1954) and three-car electric multiple units of the EW53 series (1953–1955), intended for WWK, were built in Pafawag Wrocław with the use of electrical equipment purchased in England. In 1957, 2 prototypes were built, and in 1958, serial production of the locomotives began based on the Soviet technical documentation, ET21. In 1958, a prototype of the domestic three-car EMU (EW55 series) was built for suburban traffic with adaptation to high platforms, and in the years 1958–1962 a series of these vehicles was delivered for WWK. In 1962, the first three-car multiple unit for local traffic was built, with the same equipment as the EW55, but adapted to low platforms, the EN57 series. On the other hand, the demand for electric locomotives for servicing long-distance passenger trains was covered by the intervention purchase of 30 BoBo electric locomotives in CSRS (EU05 series). A contract was also concluded for the delivery from England of 20 BoBo electric locomotives (EU06 series) with full production documentation.

1963–1971
In 1964, the electrification of the last part of the Kraków - Medyka line was completed, which had been going on since 1960 (in 1963 the Tarnów Zachodni - Dębica - Rzeszów section was electrified, and the final section Rzeszów - Medyka in 1964). On June 6, 1964, the electrification of the entire length of the Warsaw - Poznań line (after the Konin - Poznań section was electrified) started in 1958. Together with the electrified sections of Łowicz - Skierniewice (22 km - May 25, 1963) and Odolany - Warszawa Gdańska - Warszawa Praga (14 km - May 25, 1963), it constituted the electrification of an important route for the east–west direction, linking two electrified main lines Warsaw - Katowice and Warsaw - Poznań. On November 29, 1963, the electric traction connection of Katowice through Ligota - Tychy - Czechowice with Bielsko (38 km) was launched, extended on December 30, 1970, by the Bielsko - Żywiec section (21 km). On September 9, 1964, it took place on the section Czechowice - Zebrzydowice - state border (37 km). On December 19, 1966, electric traction was introduced along the entire length of the Wrocław - Wałbrzych - Jelenia Góra line (151 km); on the section Wrocław - Kuźnice Świdnickie a year earlier - December 18, 1965. It is the first electrified line of the PKP network of a piedmont character. From that moment, also in Lower Silesia, parts of the lines on which the traction network were located before the war were re-electrified.

The next important electrified route was the Śląsk - Lublin main railway line with connections towards Kraków (Batowice - Tunel section) and Warsaw (from Radom to Czachówek and from Dęblin to Pilawa), electrified in stages and launched on the following dates:

 Strzemieszyce – Sędziszów 98 km, September 8, 1966.
 Sędziszów – Kielce 66 km, September 29, 1967

Launching the supplementary sections, forming the shortest connection, was as follows:

 Tunel – Batowice 46 km September 22, 1968
 Czachówek – Radom 70 km

By the resolution of the Council of Ministers of February 21, 1963, the electrification of the Coal Main was officially started. The first completed section was Tarnowskie Góry - Zduńska Wola Karsznice, the electrification of which was completed on November 28, 1965. The second section from Zduńska Wola to Maksymilianowo has been divided into stages: Zduńska Wola Karsznice - Lipie Góry, Lipie Góry - Inowrocław, Inowrocław - Maksymilianowo along with the electrification of the Bydgoszcz Railway Junction and Maksymilianowo - Tczew (and further to Gdynia by line Warsaw–Gdańsk railway). These stages were completed on May 30, 1966, December 30, 1966, September 9, 1967, and December 23, 1968, respectively. Due to electrification, line 131 took over 70% of the freight transport of DOKP Gdańsk. The reduction in travel costs resulted in a return on investment after 5 years. The introduction of electric traction also resulted in changes in the workshops of the locomotive shed and the creation of a control point for electric locomotives in Karsznice. The electrification of the bus was completed on May 23, 1974, when the last section from Chorzów Batory to Tarnowskie Góry was electrified. The total length of electrified lines under this project was 714 km.

As soon as the 3kV direct current electrification system reached Gdynia, the voltage was switched from 800 V to 3000 V on the Gdynia Stocznia - Wejcherowo section (23 km) (October 19, 1969). At the same time, the voltage was also switched from 800 V to 3000 V on the Gdańsk Gł. - Gdańsk Nowy Port section. The separate electric traction system 800 V on the Gdańsk - Gdynia route was liquidated on December 20, 1976. The power supply was switched to 3000 V and the system was unified in the GWK. Thus, the operation of the post-German 800 V electric rolling stock operated on the Coast lasted 25 years, instead of the initially anticipated 10 years.

In the period 1969–1970, an electric traction was put into operation on the Wrocław - Poznań line, 165 km long, and 198 km including slip roads (September 24, 1970). In addition, in the first decade of the period in question, the following lines or sections of the PKP network were electrified, starting to operate trains with electric traction:

 Łódź Widzew – Zgierz 14 km, December 23, 1969

From the 1960s, the domestic industry at a rapid pace began to provide new electric locomotives and electric multiple units, which allowed a large part to replace steam locomotives, which in the late 1970s began to be phased out in favor of diesel locomotives on non-electrified lines. In addition to the mass-scale introduction of the domestic ET22, EU07 and two-section ET41 locomotives, Polish State Railways also purchased two-section locomotives of the ET40 series in Czechoslovakia, which were produced by Skoda, and in the Soviet Union Novocherkassk Electric Locomotive Plant, locomotives of the ET42 series were purchased, which were one of the strongest series at the Polish State Railways.

1972–1979

In the years 1973 - 1982 many important lines and communication routes were electrified. On October 15, 1973, the electric traction was started on the Paczyna - Lubliniec - Herby line (55 km), on December 29, 1973 - on the Kozłów - Koniecpol - Kielce line (44 km), built in 1971, and on December 4, 1974 - on the Częstochowa - Koniecpol - Kielce line (114 km). The Koniecpol - Częstochowa section was put into operation by electric traction a year earlier (December 29, 1973). An electrified large northern bypass of the Katowice junction was created, constituting an element of fundamental importance in the transport service of the areas adjacent to industrial Silesia and the Częstochowa region in the system of the electrified PKP network.

On December 30, 1974, the electrified Częstochowa - Wyczerpy - Siemkowice line (48 km) was put into operation, constituting a direct connection between the Częstochowa junction and the Tarnowskie Góry coal main - ports in Gdańsk and Gdynia. On December 2, 1975, the staged electrification of the Zduńska Wola - Ostrów Wlkp. - Oleśnica line (171 km) was completed. Zduńska Wola - Sieradz section (17 km) - 30.IX.1975 This way an electrified communication route from Warsaw through Łódź Kaliska, Ostrów Wlkp., Pleśnica to Wrocław was created. A direct electric traction connection was made between the economic regions of Wrocław, Wałbrzych and Jelenia Góra with Warsaw.

On December 2, 1975, electric traction began on the Kraków - Zakopane line (135 km). The Kraków - Skawina section was commissioned on November 12, 1970, and Skawina - Sucha Beskidzka on July 17, 1974. The commissioning of this old railway line, connecting the winter capital of Poland with the rest of the country, was commissioned by electric traction. If the construction of slip roads designed in the areas of Sucha and Chabówka stations (change of the train's head) had not been abandoned, the improvement of traffic would have been even greater.

On December 31, 1974, electric trains began to operate along the entire length of the Tarnowskie Góry - Kalety - Kluczbork - Ostrów Wlkp. - Jarocin - Poznań route (203 km). On the section Kluczbork - Ostrów Wlkp. Electric traction started earlier, i.e. on September 7, 1973. The electrification of the above-mentioned line created a second electric connection between Silesia and Poznań, and soon electric traction was introduced for further elements of port routes: Poznań - Inowrocław (101 km ) on December 14, 1976, and Jarocin - Gniezno (65 km)

In the years 1975 - 1977, electric trains were introduced according to the given dates also on the following lines (sections):

 Koluszki - Żakowice - Tomaszów Maz. - Radzice - Radom 123 km 29 May 1976
 Lubliniec - Opole 60 km., Supplementing the connection Częstochowa - Herby - Opole on December 18, 1976.

In the years 1971–1976, the central railway line was built, the CMK line was electrified in stages:

 Zawiercie - Włoszczowa 68 km on May 31, 1975.

In 1978, the phased electrification of another important Poznań-Szczecin main line was completed:

 Poznań - Rokietnica 18 km June 27, 1975.
 Rokietnica - Krzyż 66 km. September 10, 1977.

After a thorough modernization, the Szczecin Dębie - Świnoujście route (101 km) became a two-track line. On December 15, 1980, its electrification was completed (the section Szczecin Dąbie - Goleniów, 23 km was electrified earlier - December 21, 1979) On September 11, 1982, the adjacent electrified connection, Wysoka Kamieńska - Kamień Pomorski, was opened, 17 km.

In the years 1971 - 1981 the electrification of the east–west transit main was extended, the following sections were put into operation:

 Poznań - Zbąszynek 76 km, December 20, 1979.
 Łuków - Biala Podlaska, 52 km, December 20, 1979.

The electrification of the east–west main line covered the dry transhipment port in Małaszewice.

In 1981, the following electrified lines were put into operation:

 Zgierz - Kutno 57 km, 30 May 1981.
 Herby - Wieluń - Kępno 102 km October 24, 1981.

In the years 1981–1982, the line from Warsaw to Białystok and Ostrołęka was electrified including:

 Tłuszcz - Łochów 21 km December 22, 1981.
 Łochów - Małkinia 30 km (direction to Białystok) September 10, 1982.

After a thorough reconstruction and modernization, the electrification of the so-called The 101 km long line on the Odtzanska line Wrocław - Głogów - Zielona Góra - Rzepin - Szczecin Głogów (Wróblin Głogowski) was put into operation on 23 December 1982. This included:

 Lublin - Zemborzyce 9 km April 15, 1976.
 Lublin - Świdnik 12 km, December 20, 1981.
 Trzebinia - Bolęcin, 5 km (in the vicinity of the Kraków junction), June 30, 1982.

Many lines in the area of the Katowice junction were covered by electrification, including:

 Oświęcim - Trzebinia, 25 km, April 30, 1973
 Rudzieniec Gliwicki - Trzonek North, 17 km, the section closing the electrification of the northern bypass of the Katowice junction on 13 February 1976.

1980s
On October 10, 1983, the electrified section Siedlce - Mordy (19 km) was put into operation. It was the initial stage of electrification of the entire Siedlce - Czeremcha line (91 km) planned for later implementation. The electrification of this line was never completed.

On December 20, 1983, the electric traction was introduced to the section Toruń - Inowrocław (35 km). On May 31, 1984, the section Poznań - Zbąszynek - Rzepin (74 km) was covered by electrification as the last fragment of the great east–west transit main, running from Terespol through Kutno, Poznań to Rzepin station. On June 1, 1984, the electric traction on the Lublin - Dorohusk line was put into operation, the first section of which was already electrified from Lublin to Świdnik. On the section Świdnik - Chełm Lub. - Dorohusk (83 km).

On December 29, 1984, the additional electrified section Rejowiec - Żulin (9 km) was put into operation. On July 20, 1984, the Toruń - Bydgoszcz section (45 km) was put into operation by electric traction. It is the last stage of electrification of the Toruń-Bydgoszcz-Inowrocław triangle. On September 30, 1984, the section Florek - Płock Miasto (46 km) was put into operation by electric traction, extended on November 27, 1984, by the section Płock Miasto - Płock Trzepowo (6 km). On December 21, 1985, the electric traction was introduced on the entire line Kutno - Toruń Gł. (106 km) together with the adjacent section of Aleksandrów Kujawski - Ciechocinek (7 km). On the Toruń - Aleksandrów Kujawski (17 km) and Aleksandrów - Ciechocinek (7 km) sections, the electric traction was introduced a little earlier - on May 31, 1985. On May 28, 1985, the electrification of the transport line, which had been going on since 1982, was put into operation Wrocław - Głogów - Zielona Góra - Rzepin - Kostrzyń - Szczecin (342 km)

 Wrocław – Głogów (Wróblin Głogowski) 101 km, December 23, 1982
 Rzepin – Dolna Odra 106 km on May 28, 1985.

On December 9, 1985, electric traction was introduced on the shortest connection between Warsaw and Gdańsk, 235 km long, with simultaneous activation of electric traction on the Malbork - Elbląg (29 km) branch - on July 20, 1985, and in 1986 on the Działdowo - Olsztyn line (83 km). The Tczew - Gdańsk section was already electrified in 1969 as part of the electrification of the coal main line, the Warsaw - Nasielsk section in 1972 as part of the electrification of the WWK region.

 Tczew – Malbork 18 km, September 30, 1983.
 Działdowo – Iława 60 km 19.XII.1985

In order to accelerate the electrification of this important communication route, works were carried out simultaneously on both sides of the line, from the side of Tczew and from the side of Nasielsk. There were two work fronts that met in the middle section of Działdowo - Iława. On October 7, 1985, the electric traction traffic introduced in 1982 on the Tłuszcz - Wyszków section was extended to Ostrołęka. 54 km. The next important communication route, the electrification of which was completed in 1986, is the Warsaw - Białystok - Kuźnica Białostocka line. The Warsaw - Tłuszcz section was electrified as early as 1952 as part of the electrification of the WWK. The Tłuszcz - Białystok - Kuźnica Białostocka route (199 km). The work included:

 Tłuszcz – Łochów 21 km 22.12.1981
 Łochów – Małkinia 30 km, September 20, 1982
86,

On December 21, 1985, the electrification of the Wrocław - Legnica - Bolesławiec - Węgliniec route, 123 km long, was completed. Stages of this electrification:

 Wrocław Leśnica – Legnica – Miłkowice 61 km (on this line there was a risk of introducing a 25 kV 50 Hz power supply system. 23.XII.1984
 Miłkowice – Węgliniec 62 km on December 21, 1985.

On 30 May 1986, this line is completed with a second connection with an electric traction with Jelenia Góra via Lubań Śl. (section Węgliniec - Lubań Śl. - Jelenia Góra, 74 km long) and the section in the copper basin Legnica - Rudna Gwizdanów, 39 km long. On 28 May 1986, the electrification of the Kraków - Tarnów - Nowy Sącz - Krynica line reaches Marcinkowice near Nowy Sącz (the section Tarnów - Stróże - Nowy Sącz - Marcinkowice, 96 km long). The electrification to krynica was completed in 1987. The line was electrified in stages including:

 Tarnów – Tuchów 19 km, 30 November 1984 
 Tuchów – Gromnik 10 km, 23 August 1985

On September 12, 1986, the northern bypass of WWK Warszawa Gdańska – Warszawa Czyste was included in the service of suburban trains. In 1987, the railway line from Jelenia Góra to Szklarska Poręba was electrified.

Third Polish Republic

1990s
Along with the political system changes, the electrification of Polish railways slowed down. On 5 December 1994 electrified railway line 220 Olsztyn Główny – Bogaczewo and railway line 204 on section Elbląg – Bogaczewo. It was the last largest investment in the electrification of Polish railways in the 20th century. In 1995 located on the Polish–Ukrainian border the broad-gauge railway line 92 Przemyśl Główny – Medyka was electrified on voltage 3000 V DC, which facilitated access to Przemyśl for international passanger trains and eliminating the handling of international trains by Polish SM48 diesel locomotives in double traction.

7 April 1995 in Warsaw opened Warsaw Metro line M1 at station Politechnika about power 750 V DC on third rail.

Since 2000s 

In the 2000s, PKP carried out minor electrification of border lines with Germany, the Czech Republic and Slovakia.

In February 2014, work began on the modernization and electrification of the railway line 118 Kraków Główny – Kraków Lotnisko to Balice. The works were completed the following year, and the ceremonial opening of the line took place on September 25, 2015.

On May 28, 2016, the power supply to Warsaw Commuter Railway was changed from 600 V to 3000 V DC. Which ultimately resulted in the resignation from using 600 V power on the Polish railways.

In 2017, the modernization and completion of the unfinished electrification of the line 68 from Lublin Zemborzyce to Stalowa Wola Rozwadów, where the traction network was put into service on December 13, 2020, began.

In 2018–2019, the Węgliniec – Zgorzelec line 278, which is the E 30 line of the international pan-European transport corridors, was electrified. The traction network on the line was launched on December 15, 2019.

In September 2019, work began on the electrification of the Ocice – Rzeszów railway line 71, which ended on December 12, 2021, which made it possible to shorten connections to Rzeszów from Warsaw.

Unrealized plans for alternating current electrification 
In April 1959, an inter-ministerial working team was established. Thanks to the efforts of this team, a number of studies and design studies have been carried out. The electrification projects for several lines were carried out at that time in two variants: for 3 kV direct current and 25 kV 50 Hz alternating current (e.g. for the Kraków – Medyka line, the Silesia – Gdańsk and Gdynia ports and Poznań – Szczecin coal lines). a reasonable compromise, the Wrocław – Legnica line (50 km long) was selected for electrification with 50 Hz alternating current, for which a preliminary project of electrification with this system was developed. The Ministry of Communications placed an order for the supply of 70 50 Hz AC electric locomotives for this line, but the rolling stock industry did not even start to build a prototype of these locomotives, considering that it could not risk starting new production for such a small series of locomotives. In 1959, PKP also tried to convince the Ministry of Communications to electrify the Coal Main to 25 kV 50 Hz alternating current, but the idea was also rejected.

Another plan to introduce the 25 kV AC system on the Polish railways was the project high speed line Y from the turn of 2000s and 2010s, but the project has not been implemented to this day.

Specification 
Used or planned line systems

Former line systems

Current and future projects 

Currently, the modernization and electrification of the Tarnowskie Góry - Zawiercie line is being carried out, which is to enable the connection of the international airport in Pyrzowice with the rest of the railway network. In addition, from June 15, 2021, the electrification of the Pomeranian Metropolitan Railway, which was opened in 2015, is being carried out. Work is also underway on the modernization and electrification of the Ełk - Korsze section, which is a part of the line 38 Białystok - Głomno. Completion of the investment is planned by 2027.

On February 10, 2022, PKP announced a tender for the modernization of the Chabówka - Nowy Sącz line combined with the electrification of the Rabka Zdrój - Marcinkowice section and construction of the electrificted line Podłęże - Piekiełko. The works are to be completed until 2027

17 October 2022 PKP has signed an agreement with the local government of the Mazowieckie Voivodeship for the modernization and electrification of the railway line 34 from Małkinia to Ostrów Mazowiecka and the railway line 55 from Siedlce to Sokołów Podlaski. These works are aimed at restoring passenger connections that both cities lost in 1993.

As part of the government's Kolej+ program, it is planned to electrify line 24 with the restoration of passenger traffic from Piotrków Trybunalski to Bełchatów. On 16 December 2022 PKP PLK signed  with Marshal's Office of the Łódź Voivodeship contract for the performance of works modernization and electrification on line 24 worth 662 mln zł. On 27 December this year a tender was announced for the execution of design works.

2 January 2023 a tender was announced for the electrification of the Kępno - Oleśnica section of line 181.

The self-government of the Lower Silesian Voivodship also postulates the electrification of the railway line 372 from Bojanów to Góra, where passenger traffic is planned to be restored.

On November 8, 2022, PKP PLK signed an agreement with the Lublin Voivodeship for the electrification of the railway line 30 (Lublin Północny - Łuków) and the modernization and electrification of railway lines 69 and 72 on the Rejowiec - Zawada - Zamość Szopinek route as part of the Kolej + program.

The plans of PKP for the years 2021–2030 with the perspective until 2040 include electrification of the following lines:

1. Line 14 on length Krotoszyn (Durzyn) - Leszno - Głogów.

2. Line 25 on length Tomaszów Mazowiecki - Skarżysko Kamienna.

3. Line 27 Nasielsk - Sierpc - Lipno - Toruń.

4. Line 30 Łuków - Lublin Północny.

5. Line 31 Siedlce - Siemianówka.

6. Line 34 Małkinia - Ostrów Mazowiecka - Ostrołęka.

7. Line 106 Rzeszów Główny - Jasło.

8. Line 107 Nowy Zagórz - Łupków.

9. Line 108 on length Jasło - Nowy Zagórz - Krościenko part of the line Stróże - Krościenko.

10. Line 115 Tarnów - Szczucin.

11. Line 137 on length Kędzierzyn Koźle - Legnica line.

12. Line 201 on length Maksymilianowo - Gdynia Główna.

13. Line 203 Tczew - Kostrzyn line divided into stages: Piła - Kostrzyn and Tczew - Piła.

14. Line 208 Działdowo - Chojnice on the part: Jabłonowo Pomorskie - Brodnica, Laskowice Pomorskie - Grudziądz and Wierzchucin - Tuchola.

15. Line 215 on length Laskowice Pomorskie - Bąk.

16. Pruszcz Gdański - Łeba line 229 on the part: Podg. Glincz - Kartuzy and Lębork - Nowa Wieś Lęborska.

17. Line 274 on length Lubań Śląski - Zgorzelec.

18. Line 287 Opole Zachodnie - Nysa.

References

External links
 Elektryfikacja linii kolejowych
 1945
 
 

Rail infrastructure in Poland
Poland